Montgolfier is a surname. Notable people with the surname include:

 Albéric de Montgolfier (born 1964), member of the Senate of France
 Éric de Montgolfier (born 1946), French attorney and state prosecutor
 Ghislain de Montgolfier (born 1943), French winemaker, head of the Bollinger Champagne house
 Jacques-Étienne Montgolfier (1745-1799), French paper manufacturer and  balloonist
 Joseph-Michel Montgolfier (1740-1810), French paper manufacturer and  balloonist
 Paul de Montgolfier (1913-1942), French pilot
 Pierre de Montgolfier-Verpilleux (1831-1913), French engineer